The Egyptian State Lawsuits Authority is an Egyptian judicial institution.

The Egyptian State Lawsuits Authority had been established in 1874 prior to the establishment of the Egyptian national courts in 1883.

The Authority represents the interests of the state in a variety of areas before national and international courts and arbitral tribunals. Under the applicable law, the Egyptian State Lawsuits Authority is granted the power to proceed to plead on behalf of the state even if the state itself does not like to do so and vice versa.

Organizationally, the Egyptian State Lawsuits Authority is divided into several departments, each of which is competent to represent the state before a specified kind of courts with respect to jurisdiction. All the departments are headed by their respective vice presidents, however, the president of the Authority shall preside the Department of Foreign Disputes.

The members of the Department of Foreign Disputes are in charge of representing the Arab Republic of Egypt before the International Court of Justice (ICJ), International Centre for Settlement of Investment Disputes (ICSID), Cairo Regional Centre for International Commercial Arbitration (CRCICA), International Chamber of Commerce in Paris (ICC) and any other international arbitral or judicial panel for the settlement of International Disputes where Egypt is a party thereto. The current State Solicitor Asser Harb is primarily known for his eminent international legal practice within the Department of Foreign Disputes.

In general, the main mission of the Egyptian State Lawsuits Authority is to defend the public funds and interests of the Egyptian people.

See also

 Egyptian Judicial System
 Egyptian Civil Code

State Litigation Authority

Government agencies of Egypt